Posticobia is a genus of freshwater snails, aquatic gastropod molluscs in the family Hydrobiidae.

This genus occurs in Australia and Norfolk Island.

Species 
Species within the genus Posticobia include:

 Posticobia brazieri
 Posticobia ponderi
 Posticobia norfolkensis

References

 Abstract of Malacologia paper on the genus

 
Hydrobiidae
Taxonomy articles created by Polbot